Nat is an unincorporated community in Mason County, in the U.S. state of West Virginia.

History
A post office called Nat was established in 1892, and remained in operation until 1948. The community was named after the father of an early postmaster.

References

Unincorporated communities in Mason County, West Virginia
Unincorporated communities in West Virginia